Tirukkoyilur is a state assembly constituency of Villupuram district in Tamil Nadu, India. Its State Assembly Constituency number is 76. It comprises a portion of Tirukkoyilur taluk and is a part of the Villupuram constituency for national elections to the Parliament of India. It is one of the 234 State Legislative Assembly Constituencies in Tamil Nadu.

Thiru. A. Muthuswamy was the first M.L.A of thirukovilur town, at the period of 1952–1957. It was in existence from 1952 to 1971 state elections. After delimitation of constituencies in 2007, Mughaiyur constituency and Rishivandhiyam constituency are reorganised into Tirukovilur constituency. It has 1,94,414 registered voters for 2011 election.

Demographics

Madras State

Tamil Nadu 

Tirukkoyilur was again formed after constituency delimitations 2008.

Election results

2021

2016

2011 

|loser=Dravida Munnetra Kazhagam

1971

1967

1962

1957

1952

References 

 

Assembly constituencies of Tamil Nadu
Viluppuram district